Guia Risari (14 August 1971) is an Italian writer, educator and translator.

Biography 
Born in Milan, Guia Risari graduated from the Liceo Parini in 1990. She went on to study Ethics at university, getting her degree in 1995 with a thesis on Jean Améry, at the same time working as a journalist for l'Unità and as an educationalist; she also took part as a volunteer in the humanitarian mission at the refugee camp of Klana.

Risari then took up an in-depth study of antisemitism, getting a master's degree in "Modern Jewish Studies" in 1997 from the University of Leeds. Beginning in 1998, she spent a long period in France to continue her studies in Montpellier, Toulouse and Paris. Between 1999 and 2008 she divided her time between the Sorbonne and Sapienza University of Rome. In the same period, she worked as a librarian, teacher, translator, journalist, writer and lecturer, while never abandoning her work as a volunteer.

Guia Risari is often the translator of her own works, which are published in various languages. Her studies, along with Surrealism, a sensitivity towards minorities and her regard for children are all re-elaborated in her writing, to which she has devoted herself since 2001.

Literary works  
With the exception of her translations and essays, Guia Risari’s writings are usually accompanied by illustrations created by different artists: for example, the colors of Elisa Macellari for Il decamerino or Cecco Mariniello for Pane e oro and La macchina di Celestino, the collages of Marc Taeger for Achille il puntino, or the pencil drawings of Arianna Floris for La porta di Anne.

Il pesce spada e la serratura is illustrated by Altan and recalls the Surrealistic game of exquisite corpses.

Il taccuino di Simone Weil is accompanied by the illustrations of Pia Valentinis. The novel tells the true story of Simone Weil and the historical scenario in which she lived, in the form of an imaginary diary. Published in an artisan printing house, and furnished with a bookmark, the volume is presented in the style of a real diary: the pages are "in natural paper made of cotton fibres” and the binding is held together with elastic.

La terre respire, with watercolors by Alessandro Sanna, represents "a hymn to the power of nature"; Le chat âme, illustrated by Ghislaine Herbéra, narrates the story of a cat, regarded as an “animal-guide, a sort of ancestral double”; Le Petit Chaperon bleu, with pictures by Clémence Pollet, is a "Surreal version of Little Red Riding Hood".

The interaction between writing and graphics and the supervision of the edition, typical of book arts, are also the very characteristics of Surrealism, especially feminine surrealism. Similarly, elements common to literary works of feminine Surrealism are the artists’ book, interdisciplinary features, the use of fairy-tales populated by magical creatures and cats regarded as alter egos, the attention given to nature and recourse to the imagination and writing in order to combat negativity and racial prejudice.

Children’s books and novels 
In general, Guia Risari’s writings for children are part of the new Italian literary model of the 21st century, through which children are urged into active and critical reading, encouraged to re-elaborate reality in a creative way. The child protagonist in Pane e oro, for example, manages to overcome her humble
conditions with her imagination, with only the help of a piece of paper and a pencil.

Achille il puntino, also published in Spain and included in a catalogue entitled Born to Read, provides young readers with tools for discovering new worlds through speaking, literature and writing. The dot, in fact, contains in itself a multitude of meanings and images which come to life and change. Through successive metamorphoses, the dot makes it possible to visualize anthropomorphic forms and stimulates children to question the human body, an object of curiosity and mystery.

The “salvific power of imagination” resists even the most tragic reality, like that of Anne Frank, which Guia Risari revisits in La porta di Anne, in which the persecution of the Jews is narrated so as to remain impressed in the memory of all readers. It is a creative transposition made up of many elements from her studies in anti-Semitism, which previously bore fruit in her essay-writing.

Il viaggio di Lea was Finalist in the "Premio Strega Ragazze e Ragazzi" 2016-17, Category +11.

Studies in anti-Semitism 
Guia Risari dealt with anti-Semitism from a philosophical point of view during her academic studies in Leeds, going on to analyze the characteristics of Italian anti-Semitism through the work of Giorgio Bassani. Risari makes reference, above all, to the critical approach of the Frankfurt School and the analyses carried out by Zygmunt Bauman on the relationship between modernity and the Holocaust, on the basis of which the characteristics of recent times (order, homogeneity and function) have aggravated the ancient prejudice against the Jews, always regarded as the “other”, “different”, to be isolated and destroyed. For the first time, the bureaucratic machine takes on that task, relieving the individual of responsibility.

Approaching Il romanzo di Ferrara by Bassani, Guia Risari also takes into consideration the literary testimony of the Holocaust. The literature of the Holocaust, through various phases from diaries to essays, poetry and stories, is transformed into an  instrument of commemoration, interpretation and elaboration of the events and traumas. In Romanzo di Ferrara, Risari recognizes the complexity of a work that is “at the same time an historical narrative and a personal document”, in which Bassani is both a “reporter and witness, describing with increasing awareness the scene of a personal and collective trauma”, yet maintaining a calm tone. The emphasis of Bassani, in fact, is on the need to preserve the memory of an event, the Holocaust, which has stained a part of humanity, and not on the commiseration of the victims nor the cruelty of the tormentors: in other words, what counts is the right to exist of every living being.

In The document within the walls, written in English, Guia Risari probes Bassani’s narrative with accuracy, even verifying the number of those who died on the Lapide di via Mazzini, and utilizing an interpretive model that puts to good use the means of both literary and social criticism. The aim of her research is to examine anti-Semitism in Italy during the Fascist period as it is described in Romanzo di Ferrara, which should be regarded as “not a simple collection of stories, but rather a true document” about Jewish integration and Italian betrayal, about the Fascist persecution and the painful disillusion of the victims. The writer expresses doubts about the “myth of good Italians” that is based on the fact that the Italian persecution of Jews was less ferocious than that of the Nazis.

In Jean Améry. Il risentimento come morale, a work derived from her graduate thesis and for which Guia Risari won five awards, the writer suggests a re-evaluation of the idea of resentment, which she considers “the only way to moralize life and history”. The resentment of the survivors of the concentration camps is indicated as the only way to emend history, without forgetting or pardoning it, and is reassessed in the wake of Adorno and Horkheimer; i.e. it is freed from being a pathological or unsound reaction. Améry makes public his resentment with no false modesty: “the fundamental insight of Améry consists precisely in having understood the complex ambivalence of resentment, which is the refusal of the present and, at the same time, an emotional and existential bond with the past”, a "multiform revolt of the soul, which makes it possible to save and revive the memory of the offence without obscuring the use of critical reason".

The necessity of not forgetting is taken up again in the introductory essay by Guia Risari for the Italian edition of Le sang du ciel by Piotr Rawicz (translated by the same Risari), which reintroduces the double role of the writer as witness and narrator of the Holocaust, reasserting the importance of giving voice to the pain caused by others for no reason so that it will not be forgotten.

Bibliography 
Essays
 The document within the walls: the romance of Bassani 2nd ed., Market Harborough, Troubador, 2004 [1999], 
 Jean Améry: il risentimento come morale, Milano, Franco Angeli, 2002, 
 Un ciel de sang et de cendres: Piotr Rawicz et la solitude du témoin, Paris, Editions Kimé, 2013, pp. 131–135, 
 Jean Améry: il risentimento come morale, 2nd ed., Roma, Castelvecchi, 2016, 
 Il diario di Anne Frank, Milano, Mondadori, 2019, 

Novels
 Il taccuino di Simone Weil, illustrated by P. Valentinis, Palermo, RueBallu, 2014, 
 Il decamerino, illustrated by E. Macellari, Milano, Oscar Mondadori, 2015, 
 La porta di Anne, illustrated by A. Floris, Milano, Mondadori, 2016, 
 Il viaggio di Lea, illustrated by I. Bruno, San Dorligo della Valle, EL Einaudi Ragazzi, 2016, 
 Gli amici del fiume, illustrated by G. Rossi, Milano, San Paolo Ragazzi, 2017, 
 Così chiamò l'Eterno, Viterbo, Stampa Alternativa, 2018, 
 Il filo della speranza, Cagli, Edizioni Settenove, 2021, 

Short Stories

 Digestione, 2001
 Il segreto di Miguel la Lune, 2001
 Nuit Palestinienne, 2002
 Maemi, 2003
 Diario di Milaidis de los Angeles Casanova Carmina, 2003
 Le ore di Busan, 2003
 Les départs, 2004
 Dudé, 2005
 L'editto, 2006
 Pecore in Terra Santa, 2008
 In quella strada, 2009
 La moglie di Barbablù, 2010
 Quarto di luna, 2011
 Loris, 2012
 Il Soffio Millenario, 2012
 Colasabbia, 2012
 Le disavventure di Casanova, 2013
 In quella strada, 2013
 Chiave di Pioggia, 2014
 I pescatori, 2015
 Il poeta, 2015
 L'angelo dell'amore, 2015
 I giorni della prigione, 2016

Poems
 Quattro Stagioni, 2002
 J'ai vu, 2003
 Le Maître, 2015

Plays
 La Pietra e il Bambino; La Pierre et l'Enfant, Teatro Gioco Vita 2013
 I canti dell'albero, Controluce 2019

Surrealistic works
 L' alfabeto dimezzato, illustrated by Chiara Carrer, Roma, Beisler, 2007, 
 Il pesce spada e la serratura, illustrated by Francesco Tullio Altan, Roma, Beisler, 2007, 

Children’s books

 Pane e oro, illustrated by Cecco Mariniello, Modena, F. Panini Ragazzi, 2004, 
 La macchina di Celestino, illustrated by Cecco Mariniello, Roma, Lapis, 2006, 
 Aquiles el puntito, illustrated by Marc Taeger, Pontevedra, Kalandraka, 2006, 
 Aquilles el puntet, translated by Joao Barahona, Pontevedra-Barcellona, Kalandraka-Hipòtesi, 2006, 
 Aquiles o puntiño, translated by Xosé Ballesteros, Pontevedra, Kalandraka, 2006, 
 Achille il puntino, illustrated by Marc Taeger, Firenze, Kalandraka, 2008, 
 Aquiles o pontinho, translated by Elisabete Ramos, Lisboa, Kalandraka Portugal, 2008, 
 Il cavaliere che pestò la coda al drago, illustrated by Ilaria Urbinati, Torino, EDT-Giralangolo, 2008, 
 La terre respire, illustrated by Alessandro Sanna, Nantes, MeMo, 2008, 
 Le chat âme, illustrated by Ghislaine Herbéra, Nantes, Editions MeMo, 2010, 
 La coda canterina, illustrated by Violeta Lopiz, Milano, Topipittori, 2010, 
 Gli occhiali fantastici, illustrated by Simone Rea, Modena, Franco Cosimo Panini, 2010, 
 Le Petit Chaperon bleu, illustrated by Clémence Pollet, Paris, Le Baron Perché, 2012, 
 Caperucita azul, illustrated by Clémence Pollet, S.A de C.V., Ediciones Castillo, 2013, 
 El regalo de la giganta, illustrated by Beatriz Martin Terceño, Barcelona, A Buen Paso, 2013, 
 Je m'appelle Nako, illustrated by Magali Dulain, Paris, Le Baron Perché, 2014, 
 Il regalo della gigantessa, Trapani, Buk Buk, 2015, 
 O presente da giganta, Barueri, MOV Palavras, 2015, 
 El vuelo de la familia Knitter, illustrated by Anna Castagnoli, Barcelona, A Buen Paso, 2016, 
 Il volo della famiglia Knitter, illustrated by Anna Castagnoli, Trieste, Bohem Press, 2016, 
 Se fossi un uccellino, illustrated by Simona Mulazzani, Loreto (AN), Eli-La Spiga edizioni, 2016, 
 Il pigiama verde, illustrated by Andrea Alemanno, Belvedere Marittimo (CS), Coccole Books, 2016, 
 I tre porcellini d'India, illustrated by Valeria Valenza, Loreto (AN), Eli-La Spiga edizioni, 2017, 
 La tigre di Anatolio, illustrated by Giulia Rossi, Roma, Beisler, 2018, 
 Elia il camminatore, illustrated by Giulia Rossi, Cinisello Balsamo (MI), San Paolo, 2018, 
 La stella che non brilla, illustrated by Gioia Marchegiani,Verona, Gribaudo Editore, 2019, 
 Una gallina nello zaino, illustrated by Anna Laura Cantone, Milano, Terre di Mezzo, 2019, 
 Ada al contrario, illustrated by Francesca Bonanno, Cagli, Edizioni Settenove, 2019, 
 Mamma cerca casa, illustrated by Massimiliano Di Lauro, Milano, Paoline, 2019, 
 Mi chiamo Nako, illustrated by Paolo D'Altan, Milano, Paoline, 2020, 
 Molto molto orso, illustrated by Laura Orsolini, Trieste, Bohem Press, 2020,  
 Avanti tutta!, illustrated by Daniela Iride Murgia, Perugia, Edizioni Corsare, 2020, 
 Le più belle storie della tradizione ebraica, illustrated by Cinzia Ghigliano, Verona, Edizioni Gribaudo, 2021, 
 La terra respira, illustrated by Alessandro Sanna, Roma, Edizioni Lapis, 2021, 
 Le più belle fiabe regionali italiane, illustrated by Fabiana Bocchi, Verona, Edizioni Gribaudo, 2021, 
 Baci, illustrated by Andrea Calisi, Perugia, Edizioni Corsare, 2021, 
 Non siamo angeli, illustrated by Alicia Baladan, Cagli, Edizioni Settenove, 2022, 
 Voglio il mio mostro, illustrated by Ceylan Aran, Roma, Edizioni Lapis, 2022, 
 In quel baule, illustrated by Laura Orsolini, Trieste, Edizioni Bohem Press Italia, 2022, 
 Non temere, illustrated by Daniela Tieni, Roma, Edizioni Lapis, 2023, 

Translations

 Anne-Sophie Brasme, La mia migliore amica, translation by Guia Risari, Feltrinelli, 2002, 
 Tierno Monénembo, Il grande orfano, translation by Guia Risari, Milano, Feltrinelli, 2003, 
 Maryse Condé, La vita perfida, translation by Guia Risari, Roma, Edizioni e/o, 2004, 
 Marie Sellier, L'Africa, piccolo Chaka..., illustrated by Marion Lesage, translation by Guia Risari, Genova, L'Ippocampo, 2005, 
 Piotr Rawicz, Il sangue del cielo, introductory essay and translation by Guia Risari, Firenze, Giuntina, 2006, 
 Jill Murphy, Cinque minuti di pace, translation by Guia Risari, Torino, EDT-Giralangolo, 2006, 
 Jill Murphy, Una serata colorata, translation by Guia Risari, Torino, EDT-Giralangolo, 2006, 
 Jill Murphy, La signora Enorme dorme, translation by Guia Risari, Torino, EDT-Giralangolo, 2006, 
 Jill Murphy, Solo una fetta di torta, translation by Guia Risari, Torino, EDT-Giralangolo, 2006, 
 Nadia Roman, Il Risveglio, translation by Guia Risari, Torino, EDT-Giralangolo, 2006, 
 Laurence Cleyet-Merle, Il grande volo di Odilio, translation by Guia Risari, Torino, EDT-Giralangolo, 2006, 
 Sylvette Hachemi, Afganistan, translation by Guia Risari, Torino, EDT-Giralangolo, 2006, .
 Aude Le Morzadec, Cile, translation by Guia Risari, Torino, EDT-Giralangolo, 2006, 
 Barbara Martinez, Cina, translation by Guia Risari, Torino, EDT-Giralangolo, 2006, 
 Séverine Bourguignon, Dedi e il riso di Giava, translation by Guia Risari, Torino, EDT-Giralangolo, 2006, 
 Mohamed Ad-Daïbouni, Fatna e la bianca Tetouan, translation by Guia Risari, Torino, EDT-Giralangolo, 2006, 
 Marc-Henry Debidour, Giappone, translation by Guia Risari, Torino, EDT-Giralangolo, 2006, 
 Sylvette Bareau, Crescence Bouvarel, Camille Pilet, India, translation by Guia Risari, Torino, EDT-Giralangolo, 2006, 
 Etienne Appert, Ravi e i pescatori di Goa, translation by Guia Risari, Torino, EDT-Giralangolo, 2006, 
 Françoise Guyon, Roger Orengo, Thi Thêm e la fabbrica di giocattoli, adaptation and translation by Guia Risari, Torino, EDT-Giralangolo, 2006, 
 Séverine Bourguignon, Il Tukul di Yussuf, translation by Guia Risari, Torino, EDT-Giralangolo, 2006, 
 Jacquie Wines, Il pianeta lo salvo io...in 101 mosse!, adaptation and translation by Guia Risari, Torino, EDT-Giralangolo, 2007, 
 Jean de La Fontaine, Favole di La Fontaine, illustrated by Thierry Dedieu, new translation by Guia Risari, vol. 2, Milano, L'Ippocampo, 2007, 
 Jean de La Fontaine, Favole di La Fontaine, illustrated by Thierry Dedieu, new translation by Guia Risari, vol. 1, Milano, L'Ippocampo, 2007, 
 Anne-Sophie Brasme, La mia migliore amica, new translation by Guia Risari, Milano, Kowalski, 2008, 
 David Benedictus, Ritorno al bosco dei cento acri, translation by Guia Risari, Milano, Nord-Sud, 2009, 
 Michael Hoeye, Il tempo delle rose, translation by Guia Risari, Milano, Salani, 2009, 
 Jakob Grimm, Wilhelm Grimm, Biancaneve, translation by Guia Risari, Milano, Nord-Sud, 2009, 
 Dav Pilkey, I coniglietti tontoloni, translation by Guia Risari, Milano, Nord-Sud, 2009, 
 Dav Pilkey, Largo ai coniglietti tontoloni, translation by Guia Risari, Milano, Nord-Sud, 2009, 
 Jan Fearnley, Marta sta nel mezzo, translation by Guia Risari, Milano, Nord-Sud, 2009, 
 Sylvain Trudel, Le chiavi della notte, translation by Guia Risari, Padova, ALET, 2010, 
 Robert Marich, Non solo baci. I più grandi film d'amore, translation by Guia Risari, Vercelli, White Star, 2010, 
 Tonino Benacquista, Gli uomini del giovedì, translation by Guia Risari, Roma, e/o, 2012, 
 David Almond, Il bambino che si arrampicò fino alla luna, translation by Guia Risari, Milano, Salani, 2012, 
 Dominique Demers, Sos: nuova prof., translation by Guia Risari, San Dorligo della Valle, EL Einaudi ragazzi, 2017, 
 Rosie Haine, Il mio superserciziario femminista, translation by Guia Risari, Cagli, Edizioni Settenove, 2020, 
 Emily Dickinson, Una goccia sul melo, translation by Guia Risari, San Dorligo della Valle, EL Einaudi ragazzi, 2021, 
 Remy Charlip, Sottobraccio, translation by Guia Risari, Cervinara, Edizioni Primavera, 2021, 
 Rosie Haine, La nudità che male fa?, translation by Guia Risari, Cagli, Edizioni Settenove, 2021,

See also 
 Artist's book
 Children's literature
 Women Surrealists

References

External links 
 
 
 
 
 
 
 
 

1971 births
Italian women writers
Italian writers
Italian surrealist artists
Surrealist writers
Women surrealist artists
Living people
Writers from Milan
Surrealist artists